Dean Matthew Keenan (born 15 October 1985, Glasgow, Scotland) is a Scottish footballer who is currently Player/Assistant Manager for Troon. He previously played for Ayr United and Greenock Morton.

Early life
Keenan grew up in Mosspark on Glasgow's Southside and attended Our Lady of the Rosary RC Primary School and later Lourdes RC Secondary School.  Keenan began his professional football career at Greenock Morton in 2002.

Playing career

Greenock Morton
After signing for Morton in the summer of 2002, Keenan made his début for the club in a cup-tie against Queen of the South and was subsequently shown a red card following his tackle on former Celtic winger Brian McLaughlin. During his spell at Cappielow, Keenan operated in a number of roles but mainly either in defence or midfield.

Ayr United
Keenan was loaned out to Second Division side Ayr United during the January 2008 transfer window. He joined Ayr United permanently in May 2008.

Keenan scored in the Ayrshire derby. In season 2010-11 he had a cruciate knee ligament injury. He was signed on again for season 2011-12.

In October 2011, as he was due to have cartilage surgery, he was loaned out to Scottish Junior Football West Premier League side Kirkintilloch Rob Roy until January 2012.  He was released by Ayr United in early 2012.

Troon
After being released by Ayr, Keenan signed for Junior side Troon.

Keenan was appointed Player/Assistant Manager in June 2019.

Honours

Greenock Morton
 Scottish Football League Second Division: 1
 2006–07

Individual
 Troon Player of the Year: 1
 2017-18

References

External links

Living people
1985 births
Footballers from Glasgow
Scottish footballers
Greenock Morton F.C. players
Ayr United F.C. players
Troon F.C. players
Scottish Football League players
Association football midfielders
Association football defenders
Association football utility players
People educated at Lourdes Secondary School
Scottish Junior Football Association players
Kirkintilloch Rob Roy F.C. players